The 1970 Notre Dame Fighting Irish football team represented the University of Notre Dame during the 1970 NCAA University Division football season.

Schedule

Roster

Game summaries

Northwestern

Purdue

Michigan State

    
    
    
    

Joe Theismann 12/17, 147 Yds, 13 Rush, 107 Yds
First Notre Dame game on artificial turf
First Notre Dame win in East Lansing since 1949

Army

Missouri
Originally, Missouri was scheduled to host this game at Busch Memorial Stadium in St. Louis, but the St. Louis Cardinals forced the game to be moved to the University of Missouri campus because they anticipated hosting Game 6 of the World Series. As it turned out, the Cardinals finished a distant fourth place in the National League East, 13 games behind the Pittsburgh Pirates, and were below .500 from July 1 through the end of the season.

Navy

Pittsburgh

Georgia Tech

Louisiana State

Southern Cal
Notre Dame quarterback Joe Theismann completed 33 of 58 passes for a school-record 526 yards, and the Irish outgained the Trojans 557–359, but committed eight turnovers to zero for Southern Cal.

1971 Cotton Bowl vs. Texas

References

Notre Dame
Notre Dame Fighting Irish football seasons
Cotton Bowl Classic champion seasons
Notre Dame Fighting Irish football